Euphorbia polygonifolia, known by the common names of seaside sandmat and seaside spurge, is a member of the spurge family, Euphorbiaceae. It is an annual herb, native to the east coast of the United States and the Great Lakes. It has also been introduced to the Atlantic coasts of France and Spain.

References

polygonifolia
Flora of the Eastern United States